Manipuri people may refer to:
 People from the state of Manipur
 People who speak Manipuri language (Meitei language) 
 Meitei people, predominant ethnic group of Manipur
 Meitei Pangals, Meitei speaking Muslims